The GP Capodarco is a European bicycle race held in Capodarco, a city ward of Fermo, Italy. Since 2005, the race has been organised as a 1.2 event on the UCI Europe Tour.

Winners

References

External links

UCI Europe Tour races
Cycle races in Italy
Fermo
Recurring sporting events established in 1964
1964 establishments in Italy